The 15 cm schwere Feldhaubitze M 14 was a heavy howitzer which served with Austria-Hungary during World War I.

Design
The Škoda 15 cm M 14 was developed and built at the Škoda works in Pilsen.  Like other guns of the time it had two crew seats mounted on the Gun shield. It broke down into two loads for transport. The M 14 was modified to improve elevation and range as well as to strengthen the carriage as the M 14/16.

Users
The successor states to the Austro-Hungarian Empire continued to use the M 14 and M 14/16 after the First World War.  Postwar war modifications were common to make it suitable for motor traction and to address other issues.  Former enemies such as Romania and Italy also operated this series of guns whether they were captured, bought or received as war reparations after the Treaty of Versailles.

Austria
The M 14 and M 14/16 were kept in service by Austria.  Those captured by Germany after the Anschluss were given the designation 15 cm sFH M.14(ö).

Czechoslovakia
The M 14 and M 14/16 were kept in service by Czechoslovakia.  Czechoslovak weapons were known as the 15 cm hrubá houfnice vz. 14 and 15 cm hrubá houfnice vz. 14/16.  The German designation for captured Czech guns was 15 cm sFH M.14(t).

Hungary
The M 14 and M 14/16 was kept in service by Hungary.  Hungarian weapons were upgraded in 1935 by MAVAG and designated as M.14/35.  Later in 1939 another batch of guns were updated and designated as M.14/39.

Italy
M 14 and M 14/16 howitzers captured by Italy during the war or received as reparations, were put into service with the designation Obice da 149/13. Some 490 were on hand in 1939 and weapons captured by the Germans after the Italians changed sides in 1943 were used as the 15 cm sFH 400(i) and 15 cm sFH 401(i).

Notes

References 
 Chamberlain, Peter & Gander, Terry. Heavy Artillery. New York: Arco, 1975 
 Gander, Terry and Chamberlain, Peter. Weapons of the Third Reich: An Encyclopedic Survey of All Small Arms, Artillery and Special Weapons of the German Land Forces 1939-1945. New York: Doubleday, 1979 
 Ortner, M. Christian. The Austro-Hungarian Artillery From 1867 to 1918: Technology, Organization, and Tactics. Vienna, Verlag Militaria, 2007

External links
 the M 14 on Landships
 Italian record

World War I howitzers
World War II field artillery
Artillery of Czechoslovakia
World War I artillery of Austria-Hungary
150 mm artillery